The 2005 ProTour was the first year of the newly introduced UCI ProTour system, in which the ProTour teams are guaranteed, and obliged to, participate in the series of ProTour races.  In certain ways the ProTour replaced the UCI Road World Cup series of one-day races, which in 2004 was won by one-day specialist Paolo Bettini for the third time in a row.  The beginning of the ProTour saw difficult negotiations with the organizers of the Grand Tours, the Tour de France, the Giro d'Italia and the Vuelta a España.

Spring classics
Following tradition,  had a strong showing in the early season, with a commanding control of the season opener Paris–Nice, placing American Bobby Julich on the top step of the General classification, combining his strong prologue individual time trial performance and good placing in the Mont Faron queen stage. Sprinter Alessandro Petacchi shed some weight over the winter and built up a strong base to win the classic Milan–San Remo convincingly, leading to speculation that he will be the undisputed Italian team leader for the World Cycling Championship in Madrid later in the season.

Belgian sprinter Tom Boonen of  showed that he was the strongest kasseinfretter, or cobble-eater, by winning both the Tour of Flanders and Paris–Roubaix cobbled classics, propelling him to the top of the UCI ProTour rankings and thus earning him the white leaders jersey.

As the spring classics campaign continues, Bettini was plagued with injuries, but fellow one-day specialist Danilo Di Luca of  found his best form in years and won the Tour of the Basque Country race.  With his confidence boosted, he topped his form with wins in both La Flèche Wallonne and the Amstel Gold Race, leading many to speculate that he would also win the Liège–Bastogne–Liège.  However, Jens Voigt committed himself to long breakaways in both la Flèche and Liège, and in the later race was joined by Kazakh Alexander Vinokourov. Together they managed to keep the peloton behind, and Voigt was beaten in the final sprint by Vinokourov.

Grand tours
The same race also saw Damiano Cunego, who finished at the top UCI ranking last year, fall ill. In the end, the descending skills and strong form of Paolo Savoldelli earned him the maglia rosa in Milan.

The 2005 Tour de France again brought Lance Armstrong to the win, extending his record for consecutive Tour wins to 7.  Despite promises of igniting the race with the trio of Jan Ullrich, Andreas Klöden and Vinokourov, the  failed to wrestle the race control from Armstrong's Discovery team, and allegations flew abound of internal dispute within the team. Instead Ivan Basso showed himself as a main contender, though he never seemed to pressure Armstrong. As in the previous editions, Armstrong's team launched a vicious attack on an early mountain stage to discourage other contenders from pursuing the top podium. Spanish racer Alejandro Valverde of  showed that he is a serious contender for the future by not only staying with Armstrong, but by sprinting away to win the stage at the finale. However, both Valverde and green jersey contender Tom Boonen were forced to quit due to injuries.

The Vuelta brought an exciting race in which Denis Menchov was able to stave off attacks by Roberto Heras and his strong  team until the closing days of the race.  A choreographed attack by Liberty Seguros climbers, and Heras' thrilling ride down a treacherous descent, finally won him the leader's jersey. However, a doping scandal erupted two months after the Vuelta. Urine samples taken from Heras after the final time trial proved to be positive for EPO. Heras was stripped of what had been his record-setting fourth win, and Menchov was elevated to first place.

World championships
Belgian Tom Boonen had the confidence of the entire Belgian team, and won in style in Madrid.  Petacchi, despite being the favorite, claimed to have suffered from a cold, and could not keep in contention as the peloton ascended the last climb before the finale.  Valverde, having taken the Spanish team leadership after the injury of Óscar Freire, overcame his own injury to finish second, his second podium placing in race that tactically was not well-suited to his style.

The finale brought an exciting race as Paolo Bettini, having regained his form, was unleashed a little too late by Italian selector Franco Ballerini and nearly stayed away with Vinokourov in the closing meters of the race.

Summer and Autumn Classics
Having been left off the Tour de France lineup, Erik Zabel decided to join fellow sprinter Petacchi in the newly formed .  As his last race with the T-Mobile team, Zabel took the sprinters classic Paris–Tours to end his career in style.

Smarting from his disappointment at the World Championships, Bettini won Züri-Metzgete convincingly, with a 40-km solo attack in the rain that was almost derailed by his chain dropping off his chainring after his first acceleration.  Proving that he is a better climber than ever before, he won the climbers classic Giro di Lombardia in a three-way sprint with Gilberto Simoni and Fränk Schleck.

2005 ProTour results

2005 ProTour Points System

2005 ProTour Individual Rankings

Team Rankings

Team classification winner got 20 points, second 19, third 18 etc. Wildcard teams didn't score points, but ProTour teams didn't move up either. For example, no team received 20 points in Vuelta as team competition was won by Comunidad Valenciana.

2005 ProTour Nation Rankings

External links
 Official Website

 
ProTour
2005